Bidwell Mansion, located at 525 Esplanade in Chico, California, was the home of General John Bidwell and Annie Bidwell from late 1868 until 1900, when Gen. Bidwell died.  Annie continued to live there until her death in 1918.  John Bidwell began construction of the mansion on his 26,000 acres (110 km2) Rancho del Arroyo Chico in 1865, during his courtship of Annie Ellicott Kennedy. After their marriage in 1868, the three-story, 26-room Victorian house became the social and cultural center of the upper Sacramento Valley. Now a museum and State Historic Park, it is California Historical Landmark #329 and is listed on the National Register of Historic Places. The mansion was a $60,000 project, and was finished in May 1868.

When constructed, Bidwell Mansion featured modern plumbing, gas lighting and water systems. The three-story brick structure is built in an informally romantic version of the Italianate style. It also has aspects of the Italian Villa and Octagon house types present. The building's exterior is finished with a pink tinted plaster.

The first floor of the Bidwell Mansion is accessible via a ramp from the exterior of the Mansion. The interior of the entire mansion can be seen during an hour-long tour that starts on the hour most days of the week. A video is available in the visitor center for those who can not climb the 50 stairs to the 2nd and 3rd floors of the mansion.

The Bidwell Mansion Visitor Center is completely accessible. There is a gift shop, museum, theater, and comfortable lobby. There are also restrooms and water.

Trivia
 Some of the interior scenes from The Thin Man were shot inside the mansion.
 From 1925 to 1935, Bidwell Mansion was once again transformed into another entity when it served as a dormitory for Chico State Teachers College students. It is mentioned by local historians that the students studied and dressed in the rooms, but actually slept outside on the surrounding verandas. The mansion was later dubbed "Bidwell Hall" and housed the Art and Home Economics departments.

See also
National Register of Historic Places listings in Butte County, California
Bidwell Park
Michael Gillis

References

External links

Bidwell Mansion SHP web site

Wikimapia location of Bidwell Mansion

1972 establishments in California
Buildings and structures in Chico, California
California Historical Landmarks
California State Historic Parks
Historic house museums in California
Houses in Butte County, California
Houses on the National Register of Historic Places in California
Historic American Buildings Survey in California
Italianate architecture in California
Museums in Butte County, California
Parks in Butte County, California
Protected areas established in 1972
Victorian architecture in California
Tourist attractions in Chico, California
Villas in the United States
National Register of Historic Places in Butte County, California